Time is the third studio album from Christian rock band Third Day. It was released on August 24, 1999, by Essential Records.

The album features ten songs chosen from more than 30 the band had managed to write during their tour the previous year. Some of the songs left out can be heard in the album Southern Tracks, which was released with limited copies of Time.

The album is also a return to the band's original southern rock roots, after their departure to a grungier style on their previous album. According to their website "with Conspiracy No. 5, we were really setting out to prove something. With Time, we just tried to be ourselves."

Track listing
All music written by Third Day. All lyrics by Mac Powell, except where noted.

Personnel
Third Day
 Mac Powell – acoustic guitar, lead and backing vocals
 Brad Avery – guitar
 Mark Lee – guitar
 Tai Anderson – bass
 David Carr – drums, percussion

Additional musicians

 Monroe Jones – programming , acoustic piano , keyboards 
 Scotty Wilbanks – Hammond B-3 , synthesizers , acoustic piano 
 Buck Reid – steel guitar 
 Blaine Barcus – percussion 
 Jim Spake – saxophone 
 Scott Thompson – trumpet 
 Tabitha Fair – backing vocals 
 Alfreda Gerald – backing vocals 
 Michael Mellett – backing vocals 

Production

 Monroe Jones – producer
 Jim Dineen – producer (1 & 6), recording
 Blaine Barcus – executive producer
 Robert Beeson – executive producer
 Bob Wohler – executive producer
 Karl Egsieker – recording assistant
 Ryan Williams – recording assistant
 Patrick Kelly – overdub engineer
 Aaron Swihart – overdub engineer
 Glenn Spinner – overdub engineer
 Fred Paragano – additional programming and editing, Paragon Audio Productions, Franklin, Tennessee
 Shane Wilson – mixing at Recording Arts, Sound Stage Studios and Whistler's Music, Nashville, Tennessee
 Scott Bilyeu – mix assistant
 Robert "Void" Caprio – mix assistant
 Tony Green – mix assistant
 Stephen Marcussen – mastering at Marcussen Mastering, Hollywood, California
 Michelle Pearson – project coordination
 Michelle Knapp – design
 Ben Pearson – photography
 Mark Manuel – studio photography
 David Soesbee – studio photography

Charts

References

External links

Third Day albums
1999 albums
Essential Records (Christian) albums